River of Tuoni is the debut full-length studio album by Finnish symphonic power metal band Amberian Dawn.

The songs "River of Tuoni" and "My Only Star" from the album were the first Amberian Dawn tracks to have a music video recorded, in May of 2008 and January 2009 respectively.

The bonus track "Dreamchaser" is an instrumental version of a song by Atheme One, a band which featured founding Amberian Dawn members Tuomas Seppälä, Tommi Kuri, Heikki Saari and Tom Sagar. The song appeared on the band's demo, which had a limited release in 2006 and was later sold through Amberian Dawn's forum and Facebook group in December 2010.

All songs from this album are featured as downloadable content songs on the Rock Band Network.

Track listing

Personnel
Amberian dawn
Heidi Parviainen – vocals
Kasperi Heikkinen – clean guitar parts on "My Only Star", 1st and 3rd solo on "Dreamchaser"
Tuomas Seppala – all other guitars, additional keyboards, producer, assistant engineer
Tom Sagar– keyboards
Tommi Kuri – bass
Joonas Pykälä-Aho – drums

Guest/session musicians
Heikki Saari – drums
Jarmo Lahtiranta – kettle drums
Vakosametti – choir (Erkki Kaikkonen, Juha Palkeinen, Markku Haikenen, Mikko Moilanen, Teemu Paananen, Tommi Kohlemainen) on "My Wings Are My Eyes", "Lullaby" and "Passing Bells"
Peter James Goodman – male vocals on "Lullaby" and "Passing Bells"

Production
Lari Takala – producer, engineer, mixing
Tommi Kuri – producer, assistant engineer
Tero-Pekka Virtanen – mixing
Svante Forsbäck – mastering

External links
 "River Of Tuoni" at discogs

References 

Amberian Dawn albums
2008 debut albums